This page details the match results and statistics of the Madagascar national football team from 2020 to present.

Results
Madagascar's score is shown first in each case.

Notes

References

External links
World Football Elo Ratings: Madagascar

Madagascar national football team results
2020s in Madagascar